Michael I. Abrams (born December 7, 1947) is an American politician. He served as a Democratic member for the 101st and 105th district of the Florida House of Representatives.

Abrams was born in New York. Abrams moved to Florida for which he attended at the University of Miami, graduating in 1965. In 1983, Abrams was elected for the 101st district of the Florida House of Representatives. In 1992 Abrams was elected for the 105th district, serving until 1994. Abrams was chairman of Florida's health care committee.

References 

1947 births
Living people
People from New York (state)
Republican Party members of the Florida House of Representatives
20th-century American politicians
University of Miami alumni